The Ukrainian Basketball SuperLeague (USL) Most Valuable Player is an annual award of the Ukrainian Basketball SuperLeague (USL), the highest tier professional basketball league in Ukraine, given since the 2008–09 season, to the league's most valuable player in the regular season.

Winners

References

MVP
Basketball most valuable player awards
European basketball awards